The men's 50 metre freestyle event at the 1996 Summer Olympics took place on 25 July at the Georgia Tech Aquatic Center in Atlanta, United States.

Records
Prior to this competition, the existing world and Olympic records were as follows.

Competition format

The competition consisted of two rounds: heats and finals. The swimmers with the best 8 times in the heats advanced to final A, where they competed for the top 8 places. The swimmers with the next 8 times in the heats swam in final B, for ninth through the sixteenth place. Swim-offs were used as necessary to determine advancement.

Results

Heats
Rule: The eight fastest swimmers advance to final A (Q), while the next eight to final B (q).

Swim-off

Finals

Final B

Final A

References

External links
 Official Report
 USA Swimming

Swimming at the 1996 Summer Olympics
Olympics
Men's events at the 1996 Summer Olympics